The Ras Mkumbi Lighthouse is located in the northern part of Mafia Island in Tanzania.

Gallery

See also
 List of lighthouses in Tanzania

References

External links
 Tanzania Ports Authority

Lighthouses completed in 1894
Lighthouses in Tanzania
Mafia Island